Andrei Ivanov (Russian: Андрей Вячеславович Иванов; born on 24 December 1971 in Tallinn) is an Estonian-Russian writer.

He graduated from Tallinn Pedagogical University, studying Russian philology. After graduating, he lived many years in Scandinavian countries. At the beginning of 2000s, he returned to Estonia. Since then, he is focused on writing. Since 2013 he is a member of Estonian Writers' Union.

Works
 2009: novel "Путeшествие Ханумана на Лолланд" ('Hanuman's Travels')
 2011: short story collection: "Копенгага" ('Copenhagen')
 2013: novel "Харбинские мотыльки" ('The Butterflies of Harbin')

References

1971 births
Living people
Estonian male writers
Russian male writers
21st-century Estonian writers
21st-century Russian writers
Tallinn University alumni
Recipients of the Order of the White Star, 4th Class
Writers from Tallinn
Estonian people of Russian descent